The 2007–08 Jordan FA Cup is the 28th edition of the Jordan FA Cup since its establishment in 1980. It started on 21 August 2007 and ended on 6 May 2008. Shabab Al-Ordon were the defending champions, but they were eliminated in the final round. The winner of the competition will earn a spot in the 2009 AFC Cup.

Al-Faisaly won their 16th title after a 3–1 win over defending champions Shabab Al-Ordon in the final on 6 May 2008.

Participating teams
A total of 16 teams participated in this season. 10 teams from the 2007–08 Jordan League, 6 teams from the First Division.

Bracket

Note:     H: Home team,   A: Away team

Round of 16
The Round of 16 matches were played between 21 August and 25 August 2007.

Quarter-finals
The Quarter-finals matches were played between 28 December and 31 December 2007.

Semi-finals
The four winners of the quarter-finals progressed to the semi-finals. The semi-finals were played on 22 April 2008.

Final
The final was played on Tuesday 6 May 2008 at Prince Mohammed Stadium.

Top goalscorers

References

External links

Jordan FA Cup seasons
Jordan
2007–08 in Jordanian football